The Algarve Basin is a Mesozoic sedimentary basin located in southernmost Portugal, extending southwards offshore. It was formed during the Late Triassic by rifting associated with the first stage of the break-up of the Pangaea supercontinent. The basin fill consists of two main sequences that represent the two main phases of rifting: Later Triassic to Early Jurassic and Middle Jurassic to Cenomanian. The basin was inverted during the Alpine orogeny in the Cenozoic.

References

Rift basins
Geology of Portugal